Cityfone Telecommunications Inc. is a Canadian cellular network service reseller owned by Rogers Communications  which acquired it in 2010 for CAD$26 million. It provides services through Rogers Wireless. It was founded in 1997 by Dejan Mirkovic, Donald Roth, and Mark Reid.

It operates under the Cityfone, Primus Wireless, Zoomer Wireless, and, most recently, SimplyConnect brand names. It only offers postpaid plans under each.

Network 

Cityfone is owned by Rogers (which owns and should not be confused with the CityTV television network) and uses the Rogers Wireless' network. It supports LTE just like Rogers and Fido.

Products 
Cityfone carries feature phones and low-end smartphones.

Partners 
 Bank of Montreal
 Royal Bank of Canada
 Primus Canada
 Scotiabank
 Sears Canada (SearsConnect)
 ZoomerMedia

See also 
 List of Canadian mobile phone companies

References

External links 
 
Cityfone Subreddit 

Mobile phone companies of Canada
Rogers Communications
Companies based in Burnaby
2010 mergers and acquisitions